Elmin Marukić (born 9 December 1993) is a Serbian footballer.

Early career
Elmin Marukić born in Novi Pazar, began his career in his native Serbia playing for the youth team of FK Novi Pazar. 2012 he made his debut in Srpska liga istok playing against OFK Dubočica

References

External links
 

1993 births
Bosniaks of Serbia
Sportspeople from Novi Pazar
Living people
Serbian footballers
Association football midfielders
FK Novi Pazar players